Pölzl is a German surname from Austria. Notable people with the surname include:

Klara Pölzl (1860–1907), better known as Klara Hitler, mother of Adolf Hitler

See also
Hitler family

German-language surnames